This is a list of listed buildings in Bornholm Municipality, Denmark.

The list

3700 Rønne

3720 Aakirkeby

3730 Nexø

3740 Svaneke

3751 Østermarie

3760 Gudhjem

3770 Allinge

3790 Hasle

References

External links

 Danish Agency of Culture

 
Bornholm